Car lift may refer to:
Car elevator, a device which transports cars between different floors of a building.
Car lift, car hydraulic lift, 2 post lift or 2 column lift, a device which mechanically lifts a car up, so that the mechanic can work underneath.
Car ramp, a device which raises a car from the ground for access to its undercarriage.

See also 
 Car jack